Baysvalley is an 80% white suburb of the city of Bloemfontein in South Africa.

References

Suburbs of Bloemfontein